Splendrillia granatella is a species of sea snail, a marine gastropod mollusk in the family Drilliidae.

Description
The length of the shell attains 5 mm, its diameter 1.5 mm.

It is a smooth, shining, fusiform shell of pomegranate-pink color. It contains 6 whorls, of which two in the protoconch. The sculpture consists of few ribs, numbering 7 close to the body whorl. The aperture is slightly ovate. The white-colored outer lip is thin..The sinus is wide. The siphonal canal is very short.

Distribution
This marine species occurs in the Persian Gulf and the Gulf of Oman.

References

External links
  Tucker, J.K. 2004 Catalog of recent and fossil turrids (Mollusca: Gastropoda). Zootaxa 682:1–1295.

granatella
Gastropods described in 1903